This is a list of Romanian football transfers for the 2008–09 transfer windows. Only moves featuring at least one Liga I club are listed.

Transfers
This list is incomplete. Please feel free to expand

Notes and references

Romania
Transfers 2008
2008-09